is a Japanese molecular biologist. He was the sixth president of Toyohashi University of Technology and an emeritus professor of the University of Tokyo.

Sakaki was born in Nagoya. He received a bachelor's degree in biochemistry from the University of Tokyo, and received a Ph.D. in biochemistry from the University of Tokyo in 1971.

Awards
1999: Platinum Technology 21st Century Pioneer Partnership Award, Smithsonian Institution
2001: Chevalier dans l'ordre des Palmes Academiques, France
2001: Moosa Award, Biochemical Society of the Republic of Korea
2001: Award of Japanese Society of Human Genetics
2003: The Chunichi Cultural Prize, Chu-nichi Culture Foundation
2003: Medal with Purple Ribbon, Japanese Government

References

Japanese molecular biologists
University of Tokyo alumni
Academic staff of the University of Tokyo
1942 births
Living people
Chevaliers of the Ordre des Palmes Académiques
Toyohashi University of Technology people
Riken personnel